Kamila B. Richter (born 1976) is a Czech media artist.

Education 
From 2000 until 2002 Richter lived in South Africa and studied at the Technikon Natal, Durban, where she obtained her master's degree in 2001. 

In 2010 Richter finished her Doctor of Philosophy at the Academy of Fine Arts in Prague.

Career 
Richter is interested mainly in everything digitalized. For Richter, the camera’s blurred limited phase image is the proper reflection of reality. She combines mediatised reality with old master style oil painting technique, which she layers in weeklong work stages to finish her versions of mediatised streetscapes, materialize the tension of contemporary visual culture. Richter's work makes data streams and their actions visible (Emporium Spirit, New York Stock Exchange visualization, 2005, Black Vortex, Prague Stock Exchange visualization, 2006, and others).

Richter was a programmer of the early web era (0-System, web project reflecting the medium of the web, 1997 and M-System, participatory web game project, 1998).  

Since 2005 – in cooperation with Michael Bielický – Richter has developed web-based, often interactive projects controlled by real-time data fed from the Internet. Usually, market and stock exchange data, news, twitter, and other data sources guide her animated stories. The projects include Lost Objects, National Theatre Prague (2015) and Lost, Apollonia, Strasbourg (2016). Their solo exhibition LOST (2017) at the Centro de Arte Contemporáneo Wifredo Lam in Havana, Cuba, ended after the second extension.

Since 2011, Richter has used technically outdated mobile phones with low-resolution cameras to capture the nightlife on the streets of European, Asian, South- and North-American cities, usually showing blurred silhouettes of human entities, often captured in backlight atmospheres of technically disintegrated surroundings. 

Richter has participated in numerous international exhibitions, festivals, and projects. Along with virtual exhibitions, & artworks shown at the Biennale Sevilla, Museum Kunstpalast, Telegrafenamt Vienna, Art Center Nabi Seoul in South Korea, the Künstlerhaus Vienna, the DOX in Prague and the ZKM Museum für Neue Kunst in Karlsruhe.

Exhibitions 

Richter had a group exhibition at the 2nd Zlín Youth Salon (2000). And her first billboard project in the city of Zlín, Czech Republic, titled Pure Love, exhibited as part of the 3rd Zlín Youth Salon (2003). Later she continued with Guerilla public billboard projects in Prague, Czech Republic (2004). Her second major group exhibition was the seminal World as Structure, Structure as Image Exhibition at Gallery At the White Unicorn, Klatovy, Czech Republic, in 2003. A retrospective of Richter's work in collaboration with Michael Bielicky was held at the Centro de Arte Contemporáneo Wifredo Lam in Havana, Cuba. Her first major painting exhibition ended in September 2019. A retrospective of Richter's work in collaboration with Michael Bielicky is held at the ZKM Karlsruhe until march 2020.

Richter's work also appeared in seminal group exhibitions such as Biennale Moscow, Moscow (2011), Havana Biennale, Sevilla (2012), Globale, ZKM (2015), and Open Codes, ZKM (2017).

Literature 

 Michaela Vlková. Internet Art vs. Art on the Internet. In: Umělec magazine 03/2000. Prague, PNS/Transpress/Kosmas. Pp. 44ff. 
 Galerie Klatovy/Klenová (Ed.). Svět jako struktura, struktura jako obraz (World as Structure, Structure as Image). Galerie Klatovy, Klenová. 2003.  
 Pavel Liška (Ed.). HfBK Dresden - AVU Prag : Begegnung in Regensburg; zwei traditionsreiche Kunstakademien stellen sich vor. Museum Ostdeutsche Galerie, Regensburg. 2004. 
 Gemeinsam in Bewegung, Zeitgenössische Kunst aus Deutschland und China. Wuhan. Kunstverlag der Verlagsgruppe Yangtse, Provinz Hubei 2009. pp. 69 ff. 
 Hans Belting, Andrea Buddensieg, Peter Weibel. Exhibition Catalogue: The Global Contemporary and the Rise of New Worlds. ZKM 2013. pp. 328 ff. 
 Maria Christine Hoffer, Barbara Höller. Exhibition Catalogue: Time(less) signs, Contemporary Art in Reference to Otto Neurath. Künstlerhaus k/haus, Vienna 2013. pp. 106–107. 
 Renate Buschmann, Darija Simunovic. Exhibition Catalogue: The Invisible Force Behind. Materiality in Media Art. Inter Media Art Institute, NRW-Forum. Düsseldorf 2014. pp. 28 ff. 
 Davina Jackson. SuperLux, Smart Light Art, Design & Architecture for Cities. Thames & Hudson 2015. pp. 92 ff.

References

External links 
 Festival tschechischer Kunst und Kultur, Berlin und Karlsruhe, 2007
 Falling Times, 2007
 Garden of Error and Decay

1976 births
Living people
New media artists
German video artists
Czech women artists
German women artists
German people of Czech descent
German expatriates in Switzerland
Czech expatriates in Germany
Czech expatriates in Switzerland
Academic staff of European Graduate School